Trailin' is a 1921 American silent Western mystery film directed by Lynn Reynolds and starring Tom Mix, Eva Novak and Bert Sprotte.

Cast
 Tom Mix as Anthony Woodbury
 Eva Novak as Sally Fortune
 Bert Sprotte as John Woodbury
 James Gordon as William Drew
 Sid Jordan as Steve Nash
 Carol Holloway as Joan Piotto 
 J. Farrell MacDonald as Joseph Piotto 
 William De Vaull as Deputy Glendon 
 Harry Dunkinson as Sandy Ferguson
 Al Fremont as Lawlor
 Bert Hadley as Doctor 
 Duke R. Lee as Butch Conklin 
 Jay Morley as Young William Drew 
 Cecil Van Auker as John Bard

References

Bibliography
 Connelly, Robert B. The Silents: Silent Feature Films, 1910-36, Volume 40, Issue 2. December Press, 1998.
 Munden, Kenneth White. The American Film Institute Catalog of Motion Pictures Produced in the United States, Part 1. University of California Press, 1997.
 Solomon, Aubrey. The Fox Film Corporation, 1915-1935: A History and Filmography. McFarland, 2011.

External links
 

1921 films
1921 Western (genre) films
1921 mystery films
American silent feature films
American Western (genre) films
American mystery films
American black-and-white films
Films directed by Lynn Reynolds
Fox Film films
1920s English-language films
1920s American films
Silent mystery films